The Record Mirror Club Chart (also known as RM Club Chart) was a weekly chart compiled by British trade paper Music Week. It was published in their RM Dance Update, a supplemental insert, and was compiled from a sample of over 500 DJ returns.

Number one singles on the Record Mirror Club Chart

1993

1994

1995

1996

1997

See also
Music Week on World Radio History
Record Mirror on World Radio History

References

 

European music charts